The William & Mary Pep Band is the scramble band of the College of William and Mary. It is a student-run ensemble that performs at home football games in the fall sports season and basketball games in the winter sports season. Membership is open to anyone currently enrolled at the college.

History

Before 1995
The early history of the William and Mary Marching Band is generally unknown. In 1922 Cyrus Clemons Briggs organized the first band at the College of William and Mary.  Throughout the 1920s, 1930s, and 1940s, there were various efforts to organize a marching band, each of which lasted for a few years at the most, and then collapsed. It wasn't until the early 1950s, with the coming of Charles R. Varner, that a marching band at William and Mary came to be.

Mr. Varner came to the College in the fall of 1953, as the new director of bands, and immediately started a reorganization of the way that the marching band was conceived. Now that it had a stable leader, the band began to flourish. In the '50s, '60s, and '70s, the Summer Band program, staffed by members of the William and Mary Marching band, provided an opportunity for high school students to get better with their instruments and better at marching.

However, when Chuck Varner left the College, the marching band began to hit troubled times. Diagnosed with cancer in the early 1980s, Varner was forced to retire after 33 years of service. A scholarship in his name was established by the Alumni Band Organization at William and Mary in 1989 and is awarded to an outstanding band student from any band ensembles. Varner eventually died in January 2002, after suffering from Alzheimer's.

After Varner retired, the Marching Band was re-created as a free-form "explosion style" band.  This proved to be unsatisfactory to the College administration, who hired a new director of bands, Laura Rexroth.  In addition to conducting the College's Concert Band and Jazz Ensemble, Rexroth was instructed to start up a traditional marching band once more.  Membership rose from 17 the first year to 50 in the following years.  Rexroth was able to acquire College support to purchase new marching percussion instruments in 1990, and new marching band uniforms for the 1993 Tercentenary celebration of the founding of the College.  Although many at the College were in favor of the idea of a marching band, financial support for the ensemble was continually reduced from 1990 to 1998.  Eventually, the administration agreed that a Pep Band would require less financial support and decided to officially change the Marching Band to a non-marching Pep Band that performed from the stands.

1996–present
In the fall of 1996, the history of the William and Mary Pep Band began. It began as a similar institution to the Marching Band, in that it was a one credit class run by the Department of Music.  Then, in the fall of 1998, the Athletic department took over the management of the Pep Band.

Under the leadership of Jason Maga, the Pep Band sat down with Athletics, the Student Government, and the Administration to work out a new direction for the Pep Band. With the support of these groups, the Pep Band started a flyering and mailing drive across campus and to all incoming freshmen. In the Fall of 1999, the Pep Band was reformed as fully student-run organization, under the Directorship of Jason Maga.

Former directors

References

External links
William and Mary Pep Band
19 February 2011 Tribe basketball game against Radford University
29 September 2007 Tribe football game against Towson University
18 November 2006 Tribe football game against University of Richmond
Flat Hat Article on the pep band, August 2005

College of William & Mary student life
Scramble bands
Pep bands
Musical groups established in 1996
1996 establishments in Virginia